The 2003 CONCACAF Gold Cup Final was a football match to determine the winners of the 2003 CONCACAF Gold Cup. The match was held at the Estadio Azteca in Mexico City, Mexico, on 27 July 2003. A rematch of the 1996 final, it was contested by the winners of the semi-finals, Mexico and Brazil. Both teams met in the group stage at the start of the competition, with Mexico beating Brazil 1–0. Both teams progressed to the knockout stage, reaching the final where Mexico would beat Brazil 1–0 again with a late golden goal from Daniel Osorno.

Route to the final

Match details

References

External links 
 Official website 

Final
CONCACAF Gold Cup finals
CONCACAF Gold Cup Final
CONCACAF Gold Cup Final
2000s in Mexico City
Mexico national football team matches
Brazil national football team matches
Football in Mexico City
Sports competitions in Mexico City
CONCACAF Gold Cup Final
Tlalpan